The Bauchi Light Railway was a  narrow gauge railway built in 1914 to carry tin from Jos in Nigeria to the main line  railway at Zaria.

History
The railway opened in sections 1912–1914, Jos-Bukuru was widened to  narrow gauge in 1927, while the remainder closed 30 Sep 1957. The track, locomotives and rolling stock from the Wushishi Tramway were used to build and operate the line. Zaria is located to the north of Jos and the light railway was later rebuilt with a shorter connection to the main  gauge railway to the south. It also connected Bukuru.

Details 
Rolling stock was equipped with ABC couplers.

Two of the locomotives are preserved under cover with some carriages.

See also 

 Railway stations in Nigeria
 Rail transport in Nigeria

References

External links 
 BLR Locomotives 4 and 58 - scroll down
 Automatic Buffer Coupler
 Partial closure
 Village Square

2 ft 6 in gauge railways in Nigeria
3 ft 6 in gauge railways in Nigeria
Light rail in Nigeria
Railway lines opened in 1912
Railway lines closed in 1957